Krzysztof Szramiak (born 9 July 1984 in Opole) is a Polish weightlifter.

He competed in Weightlifting at the 2008 Summer Olympics in the 77 kg division finishing eighth with 352 kg. This beat his previous personal best by 2 kg.

External links
 Beijing 2008 official website profile

Polish male weightlifters
1984 births
Living people
Weightlifters at the 2004 Summer Olympics
Weightlifters at the 2008 Summer Olympics
Olympic weightlifters of Poland
Sportspeople from Opole
Jan Długosz University alumni
21st-century Polish people
20th-century Polish people